The Ein ad-Dowleh Mansion (Persian: عمارت عین الدوله) is a historical mansion in Tehran, Iran. The building belonged to Abdol Majid Mirza Ein ad-Dowleh, hence the name.

History 
This building was constructed as a summer residence for the Qajar era prime minister Abdol Majid Mirza between 1892 and 1912. After the rise of Pahlavis, Abdol Majid Mirza lost the mansion to Basir ad-Dowleh of Haravi family due to his debts.

The building is one of the possible locations for the Tehran conference, though that is unlikely.

It was listed among the national heritage sites of Iran with the number 2042 on 25 June 1998.

Images

References 

National works of Iran